Corbinian Böhm (born Munich, 7 August 1966) is a German painter, installation artist and sculptor.

Biography
Böhm has grown up with five siblings in Harlaching, a borough of Munich. One of his brothers is the ski mountaineer Benedikt Böhm. After finishing his secondary education with the abitur he studied art history at the Ludwig Maximilian University of Munich until 1990. Afterwards he first graduated from an apprenticeship as sculptor (wood, stone) and then he was majoring in sculpture at the Academy of Fine Arts, Munich. He was taught there by Hans Ladner, Pia Stadtbäumer, Antony Gormley, Timm Ulrichs, Asta Gröting and Rita McBride.

Since 1995 he is working with his partner Michael Gruber under the name Empfangshalle.

In 2000 he got his "Meisterschüler" diplom (comparable with a Master of Fine Arts degree).

See also
 List of German painters

References

External links 
 

1966 births
Living people
20th-century German painters
German male painters
21st-century German painters
21st-century German male artists
20th-century German sculptors
20th-century German male artists
German male sculptors
21st-century German sculptors
German installation artists
Ludwig Maximilian University of Munich alumni
Artists from Munich
Academy of Fine Arts, Munich alumni